Lou Engle (born October 9, 1952) is an American Charismatic Christian leader, best known for his leadership of TheCall, which holds prayer rallies.  He is the president of Lou Engle Ministries. Engle was a senior leader of the International House of Prayer and has assisted in the establishment of Justice House of Prayer and several other smaller "houses" of prayer.

Ministry
Engle has been organizing large prayer rallies since 1999, with hundreds of thousands of people in multiple countries participating. In 2018, Engle announced the end of the organization, TheCall, as well as his intentions to launch Lou Engle Ministries.

Nazirite movement

Prayer and politics
Engle strongly supports abolishing abortion. He encouraged his audiences to pray for the overturning of the Roe v. Wade Supreme Court ruling and to vote for anti-abortion political candidates. Taking a firm stand on issues traditionally associated with the Christian Right, Engle's events have drawn support from Evangelical leaders such as Mike Huckabee and Tony Perkins. He criticized other Evangelical leaders regarding the issue of political correctness.

Engle maintains that issues such as abortion and homosexuality should remain at the center of the evangelical movement. In keeping with his stance on these issues, Engle has been sharply critical of former U.S. President Barack Obama, claiming that his beliefs "counter my convictions and the convictions of masses of believing Americans."

The size of these events, in addition to Engle's political statements, has raised his prominence among the Christian right. Journalist Bruce Wilson referred to Engle as "the unofficial prayer leader of the Republican Party." These ministries are often located near prominent landmarks, such as Harvard University or the United States Supreme Court building. The locations of the ministries are strategically chosen, to specifically contend issues such as abortion.

In 2008, Engle focused the attention of his prayer groups towards supporting California's Proposition 8 ballot measure. He organized 24-hour protests in front of the United States Supreme Court, whereby the  young participants symbolized the powerlessness of terminated fetuses by placing tape over their mouths with the word "LIFE" written on it.

Controversy
Engle was described by Joe Conason as a "radical theocrat". The Southern Poverty Law Center says he can occasionally "venture into bloodlust."

While living in Washington, D.C. Engle was briefly a roommate of then-Senator Sam Brownback. Brownback later spoke at The Call Nashville rally and worked with him while drafting Senate apologies to Native Americans and African-Americans. Brownback's association with Engle became an issue in his successful run for Governor of Kansas. During the campaign, the Kansas Democratic Party ran ads criticizing his association with Engle. Brownback stated that he had not spoken to Engle in several months and that they disagreed on some issues.

In May 2010, Engle traveled to Uganda and organized a rally there through TheCall. During the rally, he praised the Ugandan government's efforts to combat homosexuality, and praised those promoting the Ugandan anti-homosexuality bill which called for life imprisonment or the death penalty for gays and lesbians with AIDS who engage in sexual relations. Prior to traveling to Uganda, Engle had released a statement condemning the penalties. Engle later stated that he opposes the Ugandan bill and says he was misunderstood while on the platform in Uganda. He called for the church to examine its own sins and to oppose violence against homosexuals.

Engle was featured in the 2006 film Jesus Camp, briefly in the 2012 film Call Me Kuchu and in the 2013 film God Loves Uganda.

Following anti-Islamic comments at a 2018 Singapore conference hosted by Cornerstone Community Church, the Singapore Ministry of Home Affairs opened an investigation into Engle's inflammatory rhetoric. Organizers apologized to local Muslim leaders, and pledged not to invite Engle back to speak.

Personal life
Engle and his wife Therese have seven children. He is known for his gravelly voice, cheerful demeanor, and vigorous rocking back and forth while praying and speaking.

Bibliography 

 , Nazarite DNA, TheCall (March 12, 2015)

References

External links
 LouEngle.com
 Justice House Of Prayer
 The Call

American anti-abortion activists
Living people
American Pentecostals
American evangelicals
Writers from Kansas City, Missouri
American Christian religious leaders
American Christian writers
1952 births